Disney's Princess Favorites is a 2002 album released by Walt Disney Records that serves partially as a soundtrack to the direct-to-video animated film Cinderella II: Dreams Come True (which there was never a true soundtrack released for), but also as a standard compilation of classic Princess-related Disney songs. It was released on February 5, 2002, and went on to peak at #3 on Billboard's Top Kid Audio chart.

Track listing
"I Won't Say (I'm in Love)" - Susan Egan, Lillias White, LaChanze, Roz Ryan, Cheryl Freeman, and Vaneese Thomas (Hercules)
"Belle" - Paige O'Hara, Richard White, and Chorus (Beauty and the Beast)
"Can You Feel the Love Tonight" - Kristle Edwards, Joseph Williams, Sally Dworsky, Nathan Lane, and Ernie Sabella (The Lion King)
"If I Can't Love Her" - Terrence Mann (Beauty and the Beast Broadway Musical)
"Reflection" - Lea Salonga (Mulan)
"Out of Thin Air" - Liz Callaway and Brad Kane (Aladdin and the King of Thieves)
"Kiss the Girl" - Samuel E. Wright (The Little Mermaid)
"Once Upon a Dream" - Mary Costa and Bill Shirley (Sleeping Beauty)
"Follow Your Heart" - Brooke Allison (Cinderella II: Dreams Come True)
"The World is Looking Up to You" - Brooke Allison (Cinderella II: Dreams Come True)
"It's What's Inside That Counts" - Brooke Allison (Cinderella II: Dreams Come True)
"Put It Together (Bibbidi-Bobbidi-Boo)" - Brooke Allison (Cinderella II: Dreams Come True)

References

External links
[ Disney's Princess Favorites] at Allmusic

Favorites
Albums produced by Bruce Botnick
Albums produced by Mark Mancina
2002 compilation albums
Pop compilation albums
Walt Disney Records compilation albums